The Open Source Initiative (OSI) is the steward of the Open Source Definition, the set of rules that define open source software. It is a California public-benefit nonprofit corporation, with 501(c)(3) tax-exempt status. 

The organization was founded in late February 1998 by Bruce Perens and Eric S. Raymond, part of a group inspired by the Netscape Communications Corporation publishing the source code for its flagship Netscape Communicator product. Later, in August 1998, the organization added a board of directors.

Raymond was president from its founding until February 2005, followed briefly by Russ Nelson and then Michael Tiemann. In May 2012, the new board elected Simon Phipps as president and in May 2015 Allison Randal was elected as president when Phipps stepped down in preparation for the 2016 end of his board term. Phipps became President again in September 2017. Molly de Blanc was elected President in May, 2019, followed by Josh Simmons in May, 2020.

The organization appointed Stefano Maffulli as its executive director in September 2021, at the end of a process set by the board of directors to transform the organization. Josh Simmons is chair of the board.

History
As a campaign of sorts, "open source" was launched in 1998 by Christine Peterson, Jon "maddog" Hall, Larry Augustin, Eric S. Raymond, Bruce Perens, and others.

The group adopted the Open Source Definition for open-source software, based on the Debian Free Software Guidelines. They also established the Open Source Initiative (OSI) as a steward organization for the movement. However, they were unsuccessful in their attempt to secure a trademark for 'open source' to control the use of the term.  In 2008, in an apparent effort to reform governance of the organization, the OSI Board invited 50 individuals to join a "Charter Members" group; by 26 July 2008, 42 of the original invitees had accepted the invitations. The full membership of the Charter Members has never been publicly revealed, and the Charter Members group communicated by way of a closed-subscription mailing list, "osi-discuss", with non-public archives. 

In 2012, under the leadership of OSI director and then-president Simon Phipps, the OSI began transitioning towards a membership-based governance structure. The OSI initiated an Affiliate Membership program for "government-recognized non-profit charitable and not-for-profit industry associations and academic institutions anywhere in the world". Subsequently, the OSI announced an Individual Membership program and listed a number of Corporate Sponsors.

On November 8, 2013, OSI appointed Patrick Masson as its General Manager. As of August, 2020, Deb Nicholson is the Interim General Manager. Under the direction of Deborah Nicholson, the interim manager, the voting and election was held with results and then halted and set for re-election due to vulnerabilities in the election process. "This week we found a vulnerability in our voting processes that was exploited and had an impact on the outcome of the recent Board Election." No election results or further updates are posted as of June 2021.

In January 2020, founder Bruce Perens left OSI over controversy regarding a new license (the Cryptographic Autonomy License), which had been proposed for the OSI's approval. Later, in August 2020, Perens elaborated on his concerns: "We created a tower of babel of licenses. We did not design-in license compliance, and we have a tremendous noncompliance problem that isn't getting better. We can't afford to sue our copyright infringers."

Eric S. Raymond, another co-founder of the OSI, was later banned from the OSI mailing list in March 2020.

In November 2020 the board of directors announced a search for an executive director which was concluded in September 2021 with the appointment of Stefano Maffulli. At the same time, the role of president of the board was abandoned in favor of chair of the board.

Relationship with the free software movement
Both the modern free software movement and the Open Source Initiative were born from a common history of Unix, Internet free software, and the hacker culture, but their basic goals and philosophy differ, the free software movement being more focused on the ethics of software, and their open source counterparts being more focused on practical benefits. The Open Source Initiative chose the term "open source," in founding member Michael Tiemann's words, to "dump the moralizing and confrontational attitude that had been associated with 'free software'" and instead promote open source ideas on "pragmatic, business-case grounds."

As early as 1999, OSI co-founder Perens objected to the "schism" that was developing between supporters of the Free Software Foundation (FSF) and the OSI because of their disparate approaches. Perens had hoped the OSI would merely serve as an "introduction" to FSF principles for "non-hackers." Richard Stallman of FSF has sharply criticized the OSI for its pragmatic focus and for ignoring what he considers the central "ethical imperative" and emphasis on "freedom" underlying free software as he defines it. Nevertheless, Stallman has described his free software movement and the Open Source Initiative as separate camps within the same broad free-software community and acknowledged that despite philosophical differences, proponents of open source and free software "often work together on practical projects."

On March 23, 2021, in response to Richard Stallman's reappointment to the Board of the Free Software Foundation, the OSI released a statement calling upon the FSF to "hold Stallman responsible for past behavior, remove him from the organization's leadership and work to address the harm he caused to all those he has excluded: those he considers less worthy, and those he has hurt with his words and actions." The OSI also stated that they would not participate in any events that include Stallman and "cannot collaborate with the Free Software Foundation until Stallman is removed from the organization's leadership."

Board members
As of August 2021, the Open Source Initiative Board of Directors is:

Deborah Bryant
Megan Byrd-Sanicki
Pamela Chestek
Hong Phuc Dang 

Elana Hashman
Tracy Hinds
Aeva Black
Thierry Carrez

Catharina Maracke
Josh Simmons
Italo Vignoli 

Past board members include:

Matt Asay
Brian Behlendorf
L. Peter Deutsch
Ken Coar
Danese Cooper
Molly de Blanc
Chris DiBona
Karl Fogel
Richard Fontana
Rishab Aiyer Ghosh
Mike Godwin
Harshad Gune
Christine Hall
Leslie Hawthorn

Joi Ito
Jim Jagielski
Fabio Kon
Raj Mathur
Martin Michlmayr
Mike Milinkovich
Ian Murdock
Russ Nelson
Nnenna Nwakanma
Andrew C. Oliver
Bruce Perens
Simon Phipps
Allison Randal

Eric S. Raymond 
Guido van Rossum
Chip Salzenberg
Tim Sailer
Alolita Sharma
Carol Smith
Bruno Souza
Paul Tagliamonte
Michael Tiemann
Luis Villa
Tony Wasserman
Sanjiva Weerawarana
Stefano Zacchiroli
Chris Lamb
Faidon Liambotis

See also

 Digital rights
 Comparison of open-source and closed-source software
 Business models for open-source software
 Commons-based peer production – an economic model for organizing projects without leaders or financial compensation
 Open-source governance – use of open-source principles to transform human social governance
 Techno-progressivism – a stance of active support for the convergence of technological change and social progress
 Open-source-software movement – the evolution and evidence of the open-source ideology

References

External links
 
 List of OSI approved licenses

Charities based in California
Advocacy groups in the United States
Free and open-source software organizations
Free culture movement
Non-profit organizations based in San Francisco
Organizations established in 1998